Al-Husayn ibn Ahmad ibn Muhammad ibn Zakariyya, better known as Abu Abdallah al-Shi'i, was an Isma'ili missionary (dāʿī) active in Yemen and North Africa, mainly among the Kutama Berbers. He was successful in converting and unifying a large part of the Kutama, leading them on the conquest of Ifriqiya from 902 to 909 and the overthrowing of the Aghlabid dynasty. This led to the establishment of the Fatimid Caliphate in Ifriqiya under the imam–caliph Abdullah al-Mahdi Billah.  However, Abdullah al-Mahdi Billah quickly fell out with Abu Abdallah and had Abu Abdallah executed on 28 February 911.

Early life
Abu Abdallah al-Shi'i was born al-Husayn ibn Ahmad ibn Muhammad ibn Zakariyya in Kufa in Iraq. Together with his older brother, Abu'l-Abbas Muhammad, he joined the Isma'ili missionary network (daʿwa) in the city around 891. According to the eastern Arabic sources, they were recruited by Hamdan Qarmat, the leader of the daʿwa at Kufa, who soon sent the brothers on a mission to Egypt.

From there, Abu Abdallah joined the annual Hajj caravans of pilgrims to Mecca, and then followed the returning Yemeni caravans to Yemen. An active branch of the daʿwa had been operating there since 881, under Ibn Hawshab in the west, near Sana'a, and Ali ibn al-Fadl al-Jayshani in the southern part of the country. Abu Abdallah arrived in Yemen in April 892 and joined Ibn Hawshab, but after barely a year, he was ordered to return to Mecca where he was told to establish a new daʿwa among the Kutama Berbers in North Africa.

Following usual practice, he was to be accompanied by another dāʿī, Abdallah ibn Abi'l-Malahif, but the latter was replaced by Ibrahim ibn Ishaq al-Zabidi. Ibrahim became Abu Abdallah's lieutenant, becoming known as "the lesser lord" (al-sayyid al-ṣaghīr) among the Kutama, and remained with him until the conquest of Ifriqiya in 909.

Mission among the Kutama and conquest of Ifriqiya

In Mecca, Abu Abdallah met some Kutama Berbers who boasted of their independence and autonomy from the Aghlabids. Abu Abdullah sensed a chance and decided to accept their invitation to travel to the Maghrib, where he arrived in 893. After successfully preaching the Ismaili doctrine among the Kutama, he was able to form a powerful army consisting of Berber peasants. He began conquering the cities of Ifriqiya up to the point where he finally took over ar-Raqqada, the palace city of the Aghlabids near Kairuan, in 909.

He had carried out all of this in preparation for the appearance of Abdullah al-Mahdi Billah, the imam-caliph of the Fatimids. Al-Mahdi was rescued from a prison in Sijilmasa (present-day Morocco) and proclaimed as caliph, ruling from the former residence of the Aghlabids.

Abu Abdullah had hoped that al-Mahdi would be a purely spiritual leader and leave the administration of secular affairs to him.  When this arrangement did not eventuate, Abu Abdullah's brother al Hasan encouraged him to overthrow Al Mahdi Billah, but he was unsuccessful. Kutama Berber commander Ghazwiyya disclosed the plot against Al Mahdi, who arranged for Abu Abdallah to be executed on 28 February 911.

See also 

 List of Da'is

References

Sources
 
 
 
 
 

911 deaths
9th-century Arabs
9th-century births
10th-century Arabs
10th-century people of Ifriqiya
Ismaili da'is
Iraqi Shia Muslims
People executed by the Fatimid Caliphate
10th-century people from the Fatimid Caliphate
People from Kufa
Year of birth unknown
9th-century Ismailis
10th-century Ismailis
9th-century people of Ifriqiya